A list of animated films produced in Vietnam in decade order :


1950s - 1960s

 Soon it will rain (1959)
 The Welldeserved Fox (1960)
 Con một nhà (1961)
 A Rabbit goes to school (1962)
 Bi Bô and Hòa
 A wish (1963)
 A flower with five petals
 A wonderful island
 A dream
 A flower dream
 Bõm
 A tree of carambola
 Đêm trăng Rằm
 The bee soldiers
 Mưu chống càn
 A farm baby and a tiger
 Em bé hái củi và chú Hươu con
 Little Cat (1965)
 Bài ca trên vách núi (1967)
 A starling who can speak (1967)
 I became to the mason (1967)
 The warm jackets (1968)

1970s

 A tale of Saint Giong (1970)
 The baby girl and the flowerpot (1971)
 A child was hard-working at Geography (1971)
 Chú đất nung
 A story of Jade Rabbit
 A crocodile was itched in his teeth
 Bee, Butterfly, Ant (1972)
 A little rooster (1973)
 A monkey who losed kind (1973)
 Thăng Long's Fire Dragon (1973)
 Drongo and Hawk (1973)
 A bud of green leaf (1973)
 Lật Đật and Phồng Phềnh (1973)
 The giant hand (1973)
 A forest of flowers (1974)
 Little Shrimp and Actinia
 And ant and a grain of rice
 Thạch Sanh (1976)

1980s
 Ông Trạng thả diều (1981)
 Turning-point (1982)
 All ones who must fear (1983)
 The tale of a mosquito
 Please buy my onion ?
 A tree by Sika Deer's horn
 Quả trứng lưu lạc

1990s
 Bộ đồ nghề nổi giận
 The talent caver-man (1992)
 Catfishes and Toads (1993)
 Phép lạ hồi sinh (1994)
 Munias and Koels
 Making a house between a lake
 How to fragrant as a flower
 A red umbrella (1999)

2000s

 Sự tích rước đèn Trung thu (2000)
 Rabbit and Wolf (2000)
 A bike (2000)
 The tale of a stilt house (2000)
 Bike and Car (2002)
 A story about two pots (2003)
 Yellow Cicada and Fire Cricket (2003)
 The adventure of Yellow Bee (2003)
 Vietnamese martial arts (2003)
 A story of shoes (2003)
 The photocopied boy
 A fairy-wings chicken
 The soiled chicken
 Kirikou and the Wild Beasts (2005)
 A time water-well (2005)
 Life
 Tít and Mít (2005)
 A dream of Green Frog (2005)
 Frogs split the moon (2005)
 Leaf and Hair (2005)
 Two crickets (2005)
 An old tale of Co Loa Citadel (2005)
 Olimpie Brow Knight (2006)
 Pieces of heart (2006)
 The Polish shoe (2007)
 The most beautiful lamp (2009)
 Cồ and Chíp (2009)
 The winter story (2009)
 Lu and Bun (2009)
 A valley with yellow grass (2009)
 The Rabbit and the Tortoise (2009)
 A duck egg (2009)
 There is a little toad (2009)
 Dưới một mái nhà (2009)
 The legend of the waterfall Đa Rơ Ga (2009)
 The fish losed their drove (2009)
 A tale of Widow's Island (2009)
 The winter memory (2009)
 The Flight Odonata (2009)
 A little ruse (2009)
 The Quail makes a nest (2009)
 A time bank (2009)
 A mission in April (2009)
 A wish of Bi (2009)
 The Detective 004
 Trời cũng phải đánh
 The Dalmatians
 Join in ant-hole

2010s

 Cánh diều họa mi (2010)
 The son of Dragon God (2010)
 Cầu vồng chắn mưa (2010)
 Gã mèo mướp (2010)
 Up in the tree (2010)
 Một cuộc đua tài (2010)
 A leaf (2010)
 Friendship (2010)
 Sơn Tinh - Thủy Tinh (2010)
 Who is an idiot one ? (2010)
 Finding happiness (2010)
 The Green Jacker Night (2010)
 The gray toad (2010)
 Cổ vật đêm rằm (2010)
 A dream in Co Loa Citadel (2010)
 A legend about ocean waves (2010)
 Vũ điệu ánh sáng (2011)
 In the Shade of Trees (2011)
 The Dragon Knight (2011)
 The pond has wings (2011)
 Say Hi to Pencil ! (2011)
 The little matchgirl (2011)
 Chiếc cầu xoay (2011)
 A peacock's hair (2011)
 A monster of lotus lake (2011)
 Chilldren are so (2011)
 Awaken (2017)
 The Silver iOn Squad (2018)
 Broken Being: Prequel (2019)

See also

 History of Vietnamese animation
Lists of animated films
Lists of Vietnamese films